Omar Duarte (born 18 July 1995), is a Colombian professional footballer who plays as a forward for Atlético Huila.

References

Is a current player of Atletico Nacional of Medellin.

External links

1995 births
Living people
Colombian footballers
Association football forwards
Categoría Primera A players
Atlético Huila footballers
People from Cúcuta